Achillea (yarrow) species are used as food plants by the caterpillars of a number of Lepidoptera species, primarily moths:

Monophagous species that feed exclusively on Achillea

Bucculatrix leaf miners:
B. albiguttella - feeds on yarrow
B. capreella - feeds on yarrow
B. clavenae - feeds on yarrow
B. cristatella - feeds on yarrow
Coleophora case-bearers:
C. argentula - feeds on yarrow
C. millefolii - feeds on yarrow

Polyphagous species that feed on Achillea among other plants

Bordered pug (Eupithecia succenturiata)
Bucculatrix jugicola
Coleophora case-bearers:
C. gardesanella
C. trochilella
C. vibicigerella
Common pug (Eupithecia vulgata)
Grey pug (Eupithecia subfuscata)
Lime-speck pug (Eupithecia centaureata)
Tawny speckled pug (Eupithecia icterata)
V-pug (Chloroclystis v-ata)
Wormwood pug (Eupithecia absinthiata)

External links

Achillea
Lepidopter